Woods is an unincorporated community in Tillamook County, Oregon, United States.  Woods lies at the intersection of Brooten Road, Resort Drive, and Old Woods Road, along the Nestucca River just north of Pacific City and west of U.S. Route 101.

Named for Joseph Woods, who settled here in about 1875, the community had a post office from 1886 through 1935. William Booth, who suggested the name "Woods", was the first postmaster.

References

Unincorporated communities in Tillamook County, Oregon
Unincorporated communities in Oregon